This is the results breakdown of the 2019 District Council elections in Hong Kong. The results are generated from the Hong Kong Registration and Electoral Office website.

Result overview

Central and Western

Wan Chai

Eastern

Southern

Yau Tsim Mong

Sham Shui Po

Kowloon City

Wong Tai Sin

Kwun Tong

Tsuen Wan

Tuen Mun

Yuen Long

North

Tai Po

Sai Kung

Sha Tin

Kwai Tsing

Islands

See also

 2019 Hong Kong local elections

References

External links
 2019 District Councils Election Official Website
 2019 District Councils Election Official Website Results

2019 Hong Kong local elections
Election results in Hong Kong